Coleraine was a constituency represented in the Irish House of Commons from 1611 to 1800. Between 1725 and 1793 Catholics and those married to Catholics could not vote.

History
In the Patriot Parliament of 1689 summoned by James II, Coleraine was not represented. The borough was disenfranchised under the terms of the Act of Union 1800.

Members of Parliament
1613–1615 Sir Barnabas O'Brien, later Earl of Thomond and John Wilkinson
1634–1635 George Bland and Edward Rowley 
1639–1645 Charles Monck (not duly elected - replaced by Edmond Cossens) and Thomas Harman 
1661–1666 Randal Beresford and Stephen Cuppage (died and replaced 1666 by William Jackson)

1692–1801

Notes

References

Bibliography

Coleraine
Constituencies of the Parliament of Ireland (pre-1801)
Historic constituencies in County Londonderry
1611 establishments in Ireland
1800 disestablishments in Ireland
Constituencies established in 1611
Constituencies disestablished in 1800